Ericeia fraterna is a moth in the  family Erebidae. It is found in China, India, Burma, Sri Lanka, the Philippines (Luzon) and Indonesia (Java, Timor).

References

Moths described in 1885
Ericeia